Søvik is a village and a regional service center in Ålesund Municipality in Møre og Romsdal county, Norway. It is located in the northwestern part of Ålesund Municipality, along the sea, just southeast of the islands of Bjørnøya and Terøya. The area was part of the municipality of Borgund until 1965 and then it was part of Haram Municipality until 2020 when it joined Ålesund.

The main church for Søvik is Hamnsund Church, located just outside the village in Hamnsund.

Søvik is a service center for the population in the nearby smaller villages of Hamnsund and Gamlem, as well as the islands of Bjørnøya and Terøya. The main industries of Søvik are fishing, shipyards, and the provision of public and commercial services. Local companies are the STX Norway Offshore AS, Mørenot, Coop, Spar, and Mix.

References

Villages in Møre og Romsdal
Ålesund